Shaher is an Iranian-made 14.5mm anti-materiel sniper rifle capable of penetrating concrete strongholds, armored vehicles, and helicopters. It can engage helicopters and other low flying aircraft.

History

The rifle was unveiled in 2012 alongside a series of military vehicles and transportation units.
In April 2014, a new version of Shaher was unveiled, featuring a 5 round detachable box magazine and Picatinny rails on the top of the rifle.

It has seen use with Taliban forces during the war in Afghanistan. It was also used against ISIS terrorists in Syria.

References

14.5×114mm sniper rifles
Sniper rifles of Iran
14.5×114mm anti-materiel rifles
Single-shot bolt-action rifles
Weapons and ammunition introduced in 2012